Lipki may refer to:
Lipki, Łódź Voivodeship, a village in central Poland
Lipki, Opole Voivodeship, a village in southwestern Poland
Lipki, Chojnice County, a village in northern Poland
Lipki, Malbork County, a village in northern Poland
Lipki, West Pomeranian Voivodeship, a village in northwestern Poland
Lipki Urban Settlement, a municipal formation which Lipki Town Under District Jurisdiction in Kireyevsky District of Tula Oblast, Russia is incorporated as
Lipki, Russia, several inhabited localities in Russia
Lipka Tatars

See also
Lipka (disambiguation)
Lipkin